Jenő Tombor (3 March 1880 – 25 July 1946) was a Hungarian military officer and politician, who served as Minister of Defence from 1945 until his death. During the Hungarian Soviet Republic he planned a successful campaign against the rebel Czechoslovaks with Aurél Stromfeld.

References
 Magyar Életrajzi Lexikon

1880 births
1946 deaths
Politicians from Nitra
Independent Smallholders, Agrarian Workers and Civic Party politicians
Defence ministers of Hungary
Members of the National Assembly of Hungary (1945–1947)
Hungarian soldiers
Austro-Hungarian Army officers
Austro-Hungarian military personnel of World War I